Valery Pryiemka (Łacinka: Valer Pryjomka; born 15 June 1983) is a Belarusian fencer, silver medallist in the 2007 European Championships and at the 2011 World Championships. At both the 2008 and 2012 Summer Olympics, he competed in the Men's sabre, but was defeated in the second round. He was also a member of the Belarusian men's sabre team at both these events.

References

External links
 Profile at the European Fencing Confederation

Belarusian male sabre fencers
Living people
Olympic fencers of Belarus
Fencers at the 2008 Summer Olympics
Fencers at the 2012 Summer Olympics
1983 births
21st-century Belarusian people